Dan Tessier (born January 3, 1979) is a Canadian retired professional ice hockey centre who last played for the Nottingham Panthers of the British Elite Ice Hockey League (EIHL).

He was featured in the first season of Making the Cut: Last Man Standing, a hockey-based reality show which aired in 2004.

Playing career
Tessier played major junior in the Ontario Hockey League (OHL) where he served as a team captain for the Ottawa 67's.  Establishing his success with faceoffs as a top aspect of his game, he was awarded the OHL Top Faceoff Award in the trophy's inaugural three years through 1998 to 2000, as well as the CHL Top Faceoff Award in 1999.  After an 84-point season in 1998–99, Tessier led the 67's to a Memorial Cup championship as the tournament hosts.  In his fourth and final year with the 67's, he was named to the OHL First All-Star Team, earned the OHL Humanitarian of the Year for his humanitarian efforts and won Leo Lalonde Memorial Trophy as the OHL's best overage player with a second consecutive 84-point season.

Undrafted by a National Hockey League (NHL) club, Tessier earned an invite to the Montreal Canadiens training camp in 2000.  He spent his professional rookie season in the East Coast Hockey League (ECHL) with the Louisiana IceGators, recording 35 points in 60 games.  The following season, he earned another NHL training camp invite with the Ottawa Senators.  Tessier spent the 2001–02 season, however, overseas in the Holland Super League with the Amstel Tijgers where he finished second in league scoring with 43 points in 33 games, as well as first in playoff scoring.

Tessier subsequently bounced between the North American minor professional leagues in the American Hockey League (AHL) and ECHL as well as the European leagues, such as the German 2nd Bundesliga (DEL2), and Deutsche Eishockey Liga (DEL), the Swiss Nationalliga B (SUI-B), and the British Elite Ice Hockey League (EIHL).

In 2004, he competed in the CBC's inaugural season of Making the Cut, a hockey-based reality show in which contestants compete for a spot on one of the six Canadian NHL teams.

On April 6, 2009, Tessier retired from his professional ice hockey career after the Nottingham Panthers' Elite League playoff defeat against Sheffield Steelers.

Hockey camps
In 2002, Tessier branched out by opening his own hockey instruction school for youths during the summer.

Awards
Won the OHL Top Faceoff Award in 1998, 1999 and 2000.
Won the CHL's Top Faceoff Award in 1999.
Won the Memorial Cup with the Ottawa 67's in 1999.
Won the OHL Humanitarian of the Year in 2000.
Won the Leo Lalonde Memorial Trophy in 2000.
Named to the OHL First All-Star Team in 2000.

Career statistics

References

External links 

Tessier's profile on EV Duisburg site
Tessier's player profile on Germanhockey.net
Dan Tessier Hockey School Website
Dan Tessier Website
Eurohockey Profile

1979 births
Amstel Tijgers players
Canadian ice hockey centres
Columbus Cottonmouths (ECHL) players
Fischtown Pinguins players
Füchse Duisburg players
Fresno Falcons players
Ice hockey people from Ottawa
Kalamazoo Wings (2007–2009) players
Lausanne HC players
Louisiana IceGators (ECHL) players
Nottingham Panthers players
Ottawa 67's players
Sheffield Steelers players
Toronto Roadrunners players
Living people
Akwesasne Warriors players
Canadian expatriate ice hockey players in England
Canadian expatriate ice hockey players in Germany